Shabo (population 7,100) is a selo of  Bilhorod-Dnistrovskyi Raion, Odesa Oblast, Ukraine, situated at the Dniester Liman, some 7 km downstream of Bilhorod-Dnistrovskyi. It hosts the administration of Shabo rural hromada, one of the hromadas of Ukraine. 

The Tatar village was established ca. 1500, called  "the lower vineyards" (attested 1788). The name was subsequently simplified to Shabag and finally to Shaba / Shabo. After the conquest of Bessarabia by the Russian Empire, the region suffered a population drain to the Ottoman Empire. Shabo in 1812 had been deserted by all but three or four families. Alexander I decided to re-populate the region, in 1822 inviting Swiss settlers of Vaud to cultivate the vineyards of Shabo. The descendants of these settlers inhabit Shabo to the present day, and Shabo wine remains famous for its quality.

Gallery

See also
Ukrainian wine
Wine production in Odesa Oblast

References

Notes

Sources
Charles Upson Clark, Bessarabia: Russia and Roumania on the Black Sea (1927), chapter 8.

External links
 Şaba - un avanpost européen sur le Nistre by Ioan Papa
 Шабо
 Торговая марка «Шабо» ("Shabo" wine)

Villages in Bilhorod-Dnistrovskyi Raion
Wine regions of Ukraine